Anna Kelles (born April 11, 1974) is an American Democratic Party politician who currently represents New York State Assembly district 125, which includes Tompkins County and parts of Cortland County.

Early life 

Kelles spent her childhood in Trumansburg, New York. She earned a bachelor's degree in biology and environmental studies from Binghamton University in 1997 and a doctorate in nutritional epidemiology from the University of North Carolina at Chapel Hill in 2008.

Kelles worked in Ecuador between her degrees as a high school biology teacher and Amazon basin ecological guide. After earning her Ph.D, she taught nutritional science at Ithaca College and Cornell University before starting a private practice in nutrition and wellness.

Career 
Kelles served in the Tompkins County Legislature 2015–2020, where she drafted legislation on subjects including public health and environmentalism.

Kelles was elected November 12, 2020, defeating Libertarian Matthew McIntyre in the general election race to represent New York Assembly District 125. Kelles considers herself a progressive democrat. Her platform includes universal health care, racial justice, economic recovery, universal child care, universal housing, criminal justice reform, and food security. She also supports mandatory vaccination, having campaigned in the midst of the COVID-19 pandemic.

Kelles visited the Auburn Correctional Facility in February 2021 in order to "bear witness" to conditions at the prison, one of the oldest in the United States. She criticized the small cells and the mental health implications of extended solitary confinement. She and other legislators advocated for the Justice Roadmap, which includes measures to reform solitary confinement and ensure fair and timely parole. She joined several advocacy groups in this position, including New York Communities for Change.

Kelles was among a number of New York State politicians to criticize Governor Andrew Cuomo after allegations were published that he had sexually harassed several women, first calling for him to resign if found guilty by an investigation led by State Attorney General Letitia James, then calling for him to resign immediately, signing on to a letter along with 58 other Democrats in statewide elected offices. She and others also criticized Cuomo for the New York COVID-19 nursing home scandal, as it had been found that data on COVID-19 deaths in nursing homes had been altered.

References

External links 
 New York State Assembly, 125th District: Anna R. Kelles
 Ballotpedia profile
 Autobiography at Kelles Nutrition & Wellness 

Living people
Democratic Party members of the New York State Assembly
Binghamton University alumni
University of North Carolina at Chapel Hill alumni
People from Trumansburg, New York
21st-century American politicians
Women state legislators in New York (state)
1974 births
21st-century American women politicians